Saleem Raza (born 5 July 1964) is a former Pakistani-born cricketer who played for the United Arab Emirates national cricket team. After playing in eight first-class cricket games for his native Lahore City from 1986–87 to 1987–88, Saleem Raza emigrated to the United Arab Emirates, where he competed in the 1994 ICC Trophy. He also played for the UAE in the 1994 Australia-Asia Cup and the 1996 World Cup. Saleem was the hero for UAE in the World Cup as his innings of 84 off 68 deliveries including six sixes helped UAE to pull off a sensational victory against Netherlands. The match was played in Lahore, the place of his birth. This was the last of his 6 ODIs in his career.

He also scored 286 runs and took 14 wickets in the ICC Trophy in Kenya. Raza was awarded the Player of the Tournament.

References

1964 births
Living people
Pakistani cricketers
Emirati cricketers
United Arab Emirates One Day International cricketers
Pakistani emigrants to the United Arab Emirates
Pakistani expatriate sportspeople in the United Arab Emirates
Cricketers from Lahore
Lahore City cricketers